Gloria Suzanne Koenigsberger Horowitz is a Mexican astrophysicist and professor working at the National Autonomous University of Mexico (UNAM). Her areas of expertise are in stellar spectroscopy, massive stars and binary interaction effects. She was director of UNAM's Instituto de Astronomía (1990-1998) and a leading member of the team that succeeded in establishing the first connection to the Internet in Mexico in 1989.

Academic career
Gloria Koenigsberger was born in Mexico City. She obtained a licentiate in Physics at the UNAM School of Sciences, graduating in 1978, and a doctorate in Astronomy at Pennsylvania State University in 1983, under the direction of Lawrence H. Auer. She served as Director of the Instituto de Astronomía of UNAM from December 4, 1990, until early December 1998, during which time the Institute initiated collaborative programs with several US observatories aimed at improving the San Pedro Mártir (SPM) National Observatory infrastructure and promoting the construction of a large new technology infrared-optimized telescope on that site.  As part of these initiatives, UNAM became the second international member of the Association of Universities for Research in Astronomy (AURA),  collaborated with the University of Texas in the construction of optical components for the Hobby-Eberly Telescope, and promoted studies for the construction of a Magellan-telescope clone at the SPM observatory.  She also promoted the growth of the Institute's research branch located in Ensenada, Baja California, and the creation of a new branch located in the city of Morelia, Michoacán, which later evolved into UNAM's Instituto de Radioastronomía y Astrofísica.

Koenigsberger holds a permanent position as professor and research scientist at UNAM's Instituto de Ciencias Físicas based in Cuernavaca, Morelos, is a member of the Sistema Nacional de Investigadores (SNI) at Level III. and a member of the  International Astronomical Union (IAU).  She served on the board of directors of the Association of Universities for Research in Astronomy (AURA) (1997-1999 and 2001-2007) and was a member of its Audit Committee from 2007 to 2016. 

Her research is devoted to the study of the structure and evolutionary processes in massive stars, particularly the effects caused by interactions in binary systems.

Recognition
Koenigsberger is a member of the Mexican Academy of Sciences.</ref>

Selected publications
Koenigsberger has published more than 120 research articles including:

References

21st-century astronomers
20th-century Mexican physicists
Internet pioneers
Living people
Mexican academic administrators
Mexican astronomers
21st-century Mexican physicists
Mexican women physicists
National Autonomous University of Mexico alumni
Academic staff of the National Autonomous University of Mexico
Pennsylvania State University alumni
Scientists from Mexico City
Women academic administrators
Women astronomers
Women Internet pioneers
Year of birth missing (living people)
Members of the Mexican Academy of Sciences